Robinson Mill can refer to:

 Robinson Mills, California, an unincorporated community known also as Robinson Mill
Robinson Mill (Somerset, Kentucky), listed on the NRHP in Kentucky
Robinson Mill (Loudon, Tennessee), listed on the NRHP in Tennessee